Rebel Girls: A Survey of Canadian Feminist Videotapes 1974–1988 was an exhibition curated by Susan Ditta at the National Gallery of Canada that ran from 14 February 1989 to 21 May 1989 as part of the Video & Film by Artists Series.

The exhibition travelled in Canada from 7 June 1989 to 15 February 1990.

The exhibition was a major survey, featuring nearly 16 hours of running time, covering 14 years of production, and providing an "opportunity to gain an historical perspective on the use of the medium by Canadian feminist film producers."

Exhibition details 
The curator used the exhibition to address women's position in television and Canadian video production.

The chronological start of the show was Lisa Steele’s piece Birthday Suit – with scars and defects, produced in 1974.  The other pieces, of which there were 32 tapes (counting Anne Ramsden’s trilogy Manufactured Romance as a single work), were organized by theme into seven programmes: The Body Politic, Requiem for Romance, The Personal is Political, Memory, Mythology, Desire, and She Works Hard for Her Money.

A common theme amongst many of the tapes is "elements of feminist video intervention (recording our histories, the personal as political, reclaiming the female body as subject rather than spectacle)". Other issues covered by the video work include lesbian sex, nudity, sexual harassment, and "slashing".

Videos, artwork, and artists

References 

Art exhibitions in Canada
1989 in art
1989 in Ontario
1989 in women's history
Feminist art
Feminism in Canada